Maksym Zalizniak (Maksym Zaliznyak) (born early 1740s in Medvedivka near Chyhyryn - date and place of death unknown, after 1768) was a Ukrainian Cossack and leader of the Koliivshchyna rebellion.

History 

Zaliznyak was born in a poor peasant family of Orthodox Christians in the Crown land in Polish Right-bank Ukraine about 1740. At a very young age he joined the Zaporozhian Host of Sich in 1753 as an agricultural employee, then a fishery one.

By 1767 he had retired both from Sich and his canteen trade and became a lay brother at  near Chyhyryn. He learnt that there was a lot of Russian money (false Dutch ducats) in the monastery and in many parts of Ukraine to fund an uprising against Bar confederation. Witnessing Bar confederation oppression of Ukrainian peasants in right-bank Ukraine Zaliznyak  decided to divide ducats among rank-and-file Ukrainians, left the monastery and led an uprising of over 1,000 cossacks and of many others throughout right-bank Ukraine.

He called himself a colonel of Zaporozhian Sich although the people often called him an Otaman. In fact he was the employee of Zaporozhian Cossacks and then the owner of a canteen in Turkish Ochakov. This was very dangerous for him because he could be sent to Turkey by the Russian army after his imprisonment to investigate his canteen activities. But as reported the otoman of his regiment Vasily Korzh in July 1768 to Russian prosecutors Maxim apart from his service as an employee had had military training in artillery and was a subcannoneer of Tymashevsky kouren (regiment) in Sich up to 1762 and thus a Russian subject by July 1768. His otoman knew nothing about the honesty of activities of the Maxim's canteen in Ochakov and about his decision to become a monk and had no connection to him for many years.

The main reasons for the uprising were the brutal enforcement of new religious and social-economic laws implemented by the Polish nobility (szlachta) during the Bar Confederation which was very negative regarding Orthodox Christianity and even Eastern Catholics. Bar confederation members were used to hang a Uniate clergyman, a Jew and a dog on a single tree to emphasize that the Uniate faith and Orthodox one (the clergymen had the same clothes) were the same with the faith of dogs and Jews. People of Zaliznyak were used to hang Roman Catholic clergymen/noblemen together with Jews and dogs in the same way as retaliation.

There was a report of a "Golden bull" issued by the Russian Empress Catherine II in support of armed insurrection against Bar Confederation and its supporters, which in opinion of Zaliznyak included all Old Believers, Armenians, Greeks, Moslems, other minorities most probably for exception of Romanians as the active participants of haidamaka movement, many Roman Catholic Poles, Jews and even some Ukrainian clergy of  Uniates who did not want to convert to Orthodoxy. He swore that he had never planned any massacres of Poles and Jews but planned to insist on their conversion into Orthodox Christianity contrary to other minorities to be cleansed together with children and women irrespective of their religion. The call to armed insurrection against Bar confederation could be inspired by father Melkhysedek Znachko-Yavorsky the abbot of the Motrynsky Monastery where Zaliznyak had become a dutiful novice though Melkhysedek had been absent in Ukraine since 1766 and had never met Zalizniyak who came to monastery in 1766.

Thousands of people throughout Ukraine responded to the Zaliznyak’s call and to ducats. In April 1768 Zaliznyak emerged from Motroninsky Forest and started to advance toward Uman.

Uman and Lysianka became the places of the most violent conflict during Koliivshchyna. At Uman Zaliznyak joined forces with Ivan Gonta, who was initially ordered by Bar confederation to attack Zaliznyak. Gonta and his men were the only household Cossacks joining Koliivshchyna. Other household Cossacks remained loyal to either the Polish Crown or Bar confederation. After Uman fell (see Massacre of Uman), Zaliznyak declared the reinstatement of Hetman State of  Right-bank Ukraine and himself the new right-bank Hetman. The Koliivshchyna movement overwhelmed the Poles, and they appealed to Russia for help.  Fearing that the rebellion would ignite a war with Turkey, Catherine crushed the rebels (known as "haydamaky" – see Haidamaka).  Zaliznyak and Gonta were captured by Russian colonel Guriev.

As a subject of Russian Empire, Zaliznyak was kept under arrest by the Russians, unlike Ivan Gonta, who was turned over to the Poles for trial and then was executed. On July 8, 1768 Zaliznyak and 73 rebels were imprisoned in Kyiv-Pechersk Fortress . At the end of the month the case was ordered to trial by Kyiv Provincial Court. In view of the fact that Zaliznyak operated in the peace time in Russian empire he and his cohorts were spared the death sentence because of the order of Elizabeth I to spare death sentences in peacetime though deaths could be because of too severe whipping (unlike Pugachev, for example, whose troops including former participants of Koliivschina operated during the martial law).  They were severely whipped and branded in the presence of the representatives of the Turkish government on the border with Turkey. There were no deaths, though many Russians not being Zaporozhians were used to die after such whipping. By November 1, 1768 Zaliznyak was deported to Bilhorod. In the vicinity Ohtyrka he and 51 comrades were able to escape by disarming the guards. Most of the fugitives, including Zaliznyak, however were quickly captured. Finally the captives were sentenced to exile to Far East or Siberia instead of life imprisonment for hard labor there because the war with Turkey had begun and it became clear that the Ottoman empire would declare a war on Russia even without the raids of Zaliznyak's detachments on Balta, Golta and Dubossary. The exile could not prevent them to run away. His further whereabouts are unknown, though rumors were that he and many exiled members of both his force and Bar confederation joined Pugachev. Catherine II became the beneficiary of his activities because many Poles and especially Jews and other minorities in the Commonwealth of Poland and Lithuania began to support Russia. Kajetan Soltyk was considered insane in Poland as the main instigator of Bar confederation being the cause of Zalizniak's activities .

Legacy 
In traditional culture of the Ukrainian people Zaliznyak lives on as a folk hero for his struggle to protect Ukrainian identity and Orthodox Christian faith though all Orthodox Christian Greeks including women and children were to be assassinated in Ukraine. A lot of Orthodox Christian Ukrainians were killed by his people as well. He had never insisted on the assassination of just Jews and Poles, his ethnic cleansing was targeted on just almost all other minorities of Ukraine. He explained that women and children being the vast majority of his army massacred Jews and Poles without any his orders. Many Jewish and Polish children became Ukrainians after his uprising while Old-believers, Greeks, Armenians, Moslems and others died together with their children. His idealized image is a subject of numerous folk songs, legends and lore. For example, Maksym Rylsky was the  descendant of the Polish student of the Uniate academy in Uman, who studied Russian (Ukrainian) in the academy and sang an Orthodox/Uniate religious song before his would-be assassination. He was not killed as the result. Illegitimate children could become only Uniate clergymen, not Roman Catholic ones. He then became a landlord, an influential Polish nobleman and the ancestor of Maksym Rylsky, who protected the  memory of Zaliznyak and Khmelnitzky.

In popular culture 
 Taras Shevchenko's dedicated to haidamaks including Zalizniak his epic poem «Haidamaky».

References

Sources 
 Great Soviet Encyclopedia

1740 births
1775 deaths
Zaliznyak
Zaliznyak
Zaliznyak
Koliivshchyna